Glaisdale is a village and civil parish in the Scarborough district of North Yorkshire, England, within the North York Moors National Park. 

The village lies on the regional walking route, the Esk Valley Walk, and on the north of England's Coast to Coast Walk.

According to the 2011 UK census, Glaisdale parish had a population of 1,018,
an increase on the 2001 UK census figure of 974.

Glaisdale Parish Church is dedicated to St. Thomas and is one of five churches within the United Benefice of Middle Esk Moor. The present church dates from 1793. An earlier "Chappell of Glaisdale", a cruciform straw-thatched building, was located on the same site: a date stone of 1585 may be seen in the side of the steps leading to the present church tower.

Beggar's Bridge 

At the eastern edge of the village lies Beggar's Bridge, built by Thomas Ferris in 1619. Ferris was a poor man who hoped to wed the daughter of a wealthy local squire. In order to win her hand, he planned to set sail from Whitby to make his fortune. On the night that he left, the Esk was swollen with rainfall and he was unable to make a last visit to his intended. He eventually returned from his travels a rich man and, after marrying the squire's daughter, built Beggar's Bridge so that no other lovers would be separated as they were. The bridge is now Grade II* listed.

In popular culture 
The Beggar's Bridge is a song telling the story of Tom Ferris by Vin Garbutt, recorded on his 1999 album Word of Mouth.

Sport 
Glaisdale Cricket Club is situated east of the village behind the train station, adjacent to Beggars Bridge. The picturesque ground is surrounded by the River Esk on three sides. The club have three senior teams: a Saturday 1st XI that compete in the Scarborough Beckett Cricket League, two Midweek Senior XI teams in the Esk Valley Evening League, and a junior section that compete in the Derwent Valley Junior Cricket League.

References

External links 

Glaisdale Parish Council web site

Villages in North Yorkshire
Civil parishes in North Yorkshire
Valleys of the North York Moors